The 1887–88 Scottish Districts season is a record of all the  rugby union matches for Scotland's district teams.

It includes the East of Scotland District versus West of Scotland District trial match.

History

The North of Scotland District was founded in this year. Initially known as the Scottish Northern Counties Football Union, on 24 November 1887 a meeting was held in Watson's Restaurant in Aberdeen to elect office bearers. Those noted were:- George Cruden (President);  D. M. Milligan (Vice President); C. Sleigh (Secretary).

Rules of the North of Scotland District were agreed on 2 December 1887.

A North of Scotland District match was arranged with Glasgow District to take place in Cupar on 31 December 1887. Another match was arranged with Edinburgh District on 21 January 1888 in Aberdeen.

Owing to frost, the planned match between the North and Glasgow had to be abandoned. It is noted that a great many matches were postponed in January and February; and it seems the planned Edinburgh District match was also abandoned. North of Scotland did manage a match against Merchiston Castle - but it was noted that it was played in a blizzard.

Edinburgh District won back the Inter-City for the first time in 4 years.

The East v West match was postponed from 28 January 1888. It was played on 11 February 1888 and the East won.

Results

Inter-City

Glasgow District:

Edinburgh District:

Other Scottish matches

East:

West: 

North of Scotland District:

Merchiston Castle:

English matches

No other District matches played.

International matches

No touring matches this season.

References

1887–88 in Scottish rugby union
Scottish Districts seasons